The 2019–20 Oregon State Beavers men's basketball team represented Oregon State University in the 2019–20 NCAA Division I men's basketball season. The Beavers were led by sixth-year head coach Wayne Tinkle, and played their home games at Gill Coliseum in Corvallis, Oregon as members of the Pac-12 Conference. They finished the season 18–13, 7–11 in Pac-12 play to finish in a three-way tie for eighth place. They defeated Utah in the first round of the Pac-12 tournament and were set to take on rival Oregon in the quarterfinals before the remainder of the Pac-12 Tournament was cancelled amid the COVID-19 pandemic.

Previous season
The 2017–18 Beavers finished the 2018–19 season 18–13, 10–8 in Pac-12 play to finish in a three-way tie for fourth place. They lost in the quarterfinals of the Pac-12 tournament to Colorado. Despite having 18 wins and a better record they failed to get an invitation to the National Invitation Tournament and also ruled out of the College Basketball Invitational.

Off-season

Departures

Incoming transfers

2019 recruiting class

Roster

Schedule and results

|-
!colspan=12 style=| Exhibition

|-
!colspan=12 style=| Non-conference regular season

|-
!colspan=12 style=| Pac-12 regular season

|-
!colspan=12 style=| Pac-12 tournament

|- style="background:#bbbbbb"
| style="text-align:center"|March 12, 202012:00 pm, P12N
| style="text-align:center"| (8)
| vs. (1) No. 13 OregonQuarterfinals/Civil War
| colspan=5 rowspan=1 style="text-align:center"|Cancelled due to the COVID-19 pandemic
| style="text-align:center"|T-Mobile ArenaParadise, NV
|-

References

Oregon State Beavers men's basketball seasons
Oregon State
Oregon State Beavers men's basketball
Oregon State Beavers men's basketball